Alianza Cristiana is a Peruvian football club, playing in the city of Andoas, Datem del Marañón, Loreto, Peru.

History
Alianza Cristiana was founded on April 14, 2008, by Robinson Arahuanasa.

In the 2012 Copa Perú, the club classified to the National Stage, but was eliminated by Universidad Técnica de Cajamarca in the semifinals.

In the 2013 Peruvian Segunda División, The club was disabled and relegated to the Copa Perú for outstanding debts with the SAFAP.

Honours

Regional
Región III: 1
Winners (1): 2012

Liga Departamental de Loreto: 1
Winners (1): 2012

Liga Provincial de Datem del Marañón: 1
Winners (1): 2012

Liga Distrital de Andoas: 1
Winners (1): 2012

See also
List of football clubs in Peru
Peruvian football league system

External links
 Official Facebook

Football clubs in Peru
University and college association football clubs
2008 establishments in Peru